Brewerville Precinct is located in Randolph County, Illinois, USA.  According to the 2010 census, its population was 285.

Geography

References

Precincts in Randolph County, Illinois